Bichaghchis or Bichaghchi people, are a Turkic sub-ethnic group of Turks in Iran,  mainly living in Kerman Province. The Bichaghchis  are predominantly Shi'a Muslim and speak Azerbaijani language and Persian language.

References

Kerman Province
Ethnic groups in Iran
Turkic peoples of Asia